Cornelia Wilhelmina "Mien" Marchant (1866-1952) was a Dutch artist.

Biography 
Marchant was born on 6 June 1866 in Gorinchem. Her work was included in the 1939 exhibition and sale Onze Kunst van Heden (Our Art of Today) at the Rijksmuseum in Amsterdam. Marchant died on 11 July 1973 in Laren, North Holland.

References

External links 
images of Marchant's work on RKD

1866 births
1952 deaths
People from Gorinchem
20th-century Dutch women artists